Tsarevich Alexei is a 1997 Russian historical drama film directed by Vitaly Melnikov.

Plot 
Tsarevich Alexei was one of the smartest people in the state. His father Peter hoped that he would take his place, but Alexei did not want to be king.

Cast 
 Aleksey Zuyev as Tsarevich Aleksei Petrovich
 Viktor Stepanov as Pyotr I, 'Peter the Great'
 Ekaterina Kulakov as Afrosin'ya Fedorova, Aleksei's lover
 Natalya Egorova as Tsaritsa Ekaterina
 Roman Gromadskiy
 Stanislav Lyubshin as Pyotr Andreyevich Tolstoi
 Vladimir Menshov as Aleksandr Danilovich Menshikov
 Leon Niemczyk as Count Schonborn
 Fyodor Stukov

References

External links 
 

1997 films
1990s Russian-language films
Russian historical drama films
1990s historical drama films